Oeuf or Œuf may refer to:

 the French word for "egg", in English used in culinary contexts
 Œuf (river), the upper course of the Essonne River in the Île-de-France region of France
 Œuf-en-Ternois, a commune in the Hauts-de-France region of France
 "Oeuf" (Hannibal), an episode of the TV series Hannibal

See also

 
 
 EUF (disambiguation)
 Ouf (disambiguation)